A. J. Green (born 1988) is an American football player.

A. J. Green may also refer to:

A. J. Green (basketball) (born 1999), American basketball player
A. J. Green (defensive back) (born 1998), American football player